Mark Knowles and Daniel Nestor defeated Simon Aspelin and Julian Knowle in the final, 6–2, 6–3 to win the doubles tennis title at the 2007 Tennis Masters Cup.

Jonas Björkman and Max Mirnyi were the defending champions, but were eliminated in the round-robin stage.

Though the Bob and Mike Bryan qualified as the top team, they withdrew before the event due to an elbow injury to Mike.

Seeds

Draw

Finals

Red group
Standings are determined by: 1. number of wins; 2. number of matches; 3. in two-players-ties, head-to-head records; 4. in three-players-ties, percentage of sets won, or of games won; 5. steering-committee decision.

Gold group
Standings are determined by: 1. number of wins; 2. number of matches; 3. in two-players-ties, head-to-head records; 4. in three-players-ties, percentage of sets won, or of games won; 5. steering-committee decision.

External links
Draw

Doubles